Count Kálmán Hunyady de Kéthely (born 13 October 1828, died 17 May 1901) was a Hungarian aristocrat, horse rider and by birth member of the prominent Hunyady de Kéthely family.

Early life
Kálmán was born as the second son Count Ferenc Hunyady de Kéthely (1804–1882) and his wife, Countess Júlia Zichy de Zich et Vásonkeő (1808–1873). His other siblings were his brother Count László Hunyady de Kéthely (1826-1898) and a sister, Princess Julia of Serbia.

Biography
He was the first president of the Viennese Harness Racing Club (Wiener Trabrenn-Verein) that was founded in 1874. Four years later the club opened a racing track in Leopoldstadt, Vienna. Krieau racecourse is the second oldest race track in Europe.

Hunyady died in 1901 and a horse race was soon established for his honour. The annual Graf Kalman Hunyady Memorial at Krieau is one of the oldest international races in European harness racing.

Kálmán Hunyady's sister was Júlia Hunyady de Kéthely. She was the Princess consort of Serbia as the wife of Mihailo Obrenović III.

Personal life
On 6 October 1862 he married Countess Alexandrine von Buol-Schauenstein (1837-1901). They had one son and one daughter:

 Count Károly Ferenc Mátyás Hunyady de Kéthely (1864-1933), married to Countess Maria Nádasdy de Nádasd et Fogarasföld (1873-1925); had issue
 Countess Julia Hunyady de Kéthely (1867-1943), married to Count Hugo Alexander Klemens Wenzeslaus von Boos zu Waldeck und Montfort (1869-1945); had issue

References 

1828 births
1901 deaths
Nobility from Vienna
Kalman
People in harness racing